Paraspinibarbus macracanthus, the pocket-like lip barbel, is a species of freshwater ray-finned fish from the carp and minnow family, the Cyprinidae. It occurs in the Nam Xam and Nam Ma river basins in Laos, the Red River basin in Vietnam and Yunnan, as well as in most of the coastal drainage basins of northern Vietnam.

References

Fish described in 1936
Fish of Vietnam
Cyprinid fish of Asia